Rodney Leon Brasfield (August 22, 1910 – September 12, 1958) was an American comedian who was prominently featured on the Grand Ole Opry from 1947 until his death in 1958. In 1987, he was inducted into the Country Music Hall of Fame.

Life and career
Brasfield was born in Smithville, Mississippi, United States. He began his career in the late 1920s with Bisbee's Dramatic Shows, a touring tent repertory troupe, serving as a straight man for his older brother, actor and comedian Boob Brasfield. In 1931, he married Eleanor Humphrey, a Hohenwald, Tennessee school teacher.

Brasfield was recruited by George D. Hay for the Grand Ole Opry in 1944. With his trademark baggy suit, battered hat and rubbery face, he could make audiences laugh before he spoke a word. He soon became the primary comic on The Prince Albert Show, the Opry's NBC Radio broadcast, playing off the show’s host, Red Foley. Assuming the role of a hapless hayseed, he often poked fun at country life—always with good humor.

He formed a double act in 1948 with Minnie Pearl, playing what she referred to as "double comedy", in which each of them delivered alternating punch lines and neither played the straight man. Some of these routines were broadcast on the Opry's live ABC television network show from 1955–56. He lived in Hohenwald, called himself the Hohenwald Flash, and often mentioned the local restaurant (which he once owned), the Snip-Snap-and-Bite, in his routines. Brasfield sometimes did ventriloquist routines with a dummy named Bocephus, after whom Hank Williams Sr. nicknamed his then-infant son Hank Williams Jr.; and also did comedy with June Carter.

In March 1956, Brasfield appeared with Elvis Presley at Atlanta's Fox Theatre. In A Face in the Crowd (1957) he played Andy Griffith’s ex-con sidekick, and appeared in Country Music Holiday (1958). Heart failure combined with an ongoing problem with alcohol abuse, led to his death at age 48 in 1958 in Martin, Tennessee. He is buried in Smithville.

Filmography

References

Other sources
 Encyclopedia of Country Music, Country Music Hall of Fame and Museum (Oxford University Press)
 Faye, Byron "Remembering Rod Brasfield", FayFair's Opry Blog, August 22, 2011 
 Rod Brasfield - Smithville at the Mississippi Country Music Trail

External links

 At the Country Music Hall of Fame
 

1910 births
1958 deaths
American country singer-songwriters
American male comedians
American radio personalities
Country Music Hall of Fame inductees
Grand Ole Opry members
People from Monroe County, Mississippi
Singer-songwriters from Mississippi
People from Hohenwald, Tennessee
20th-century American comedians
20th-century American singers
Country musicians from Tennessee
Country musicians from Mississippi
Singer-songwriters from Tennessee